Tuyên Quang is a city in Vietnam, and is the capital of Tuyên Quang Province.

History
The French post at Tuyên Quang was defended for four months against 12,000 troops of the Yunnan Army and the Black Flag Army by two companies of the French Foreign Legion during the Sino-French War (August 1884 to April 1885). The Siege of Tuyên Quang is still remembered as one of the Legion's most celebrated feats of arms, and is commemorated in the first verse of "Le Boudin", its principal marching song.

During the French protectorate, Tuyên Quang served as a garrison. During the Democratic Republic of Vietnam, the Viet Minh made the Legionnaires surrender at the memorial to the Battle of Tuyên Quang in the First Indochina War (1946–54).

Administrative divisions
Phuong: Hưng Thành, Nông Tiến, Ỷ La, Minh Xuân, Phan Thiết, Tân Quang, Tân Hà. Communes: Tràng Đà, An Tường, Lưỡng Vượng, An Khang, Thái Long, Đội Cấn.

Climate

References

Populated places in Tuyên Quang province
Provincial capitals in Vietnam
Districts of Tuyên Quang province
Cities in Vietnam
Tuyên Quang province